Calisto da Costa (born 6 February 1979) is an East Timorese athlete. He was one of the first athletes to represent East Timor at the Olympic Games, when he competed at the Men's Marathon at the 2000 Summer Olympics in Sydney, though he technically competed as an individual athlete because East Timor was newly independent and had not yet been formally recognized by the International Olympic Committee.  Costa was one of the ten East Timorese athletes who received training in Darwin, Northern Territory prior to his participation in the Sydney Olympic Games. He finished in 71st place at 2:33:11.

Besides competing in the 2000 Summer Olympics, Costa also competed in the Dili-Marathon where he finished 3rd place at 2:34:52, and in the 2011 New York City Marathon where he finished 276th place at 2:46:04.

References

External links
 

1979 births
Living people
East Timorese male long-distance runners
Olympic athletes of East Timor
Athletes (track and field) at the 2000 Summer Olympics
People from Dili
East Timorese male marathon runners